Fateh Pur is a city in the Layyah district of Punjab, Pakistan. It was established in the 1980s and acquired sub-tehsil status on January 7, 2007 in the Karor Lal Eason Tehsil. Fateh Pur is the third largest city in the Layyah district.

Economy 
The economy of the area depends upon government jobs and other private jobs and agriculture-related businesses.

Major crops 
Common crops grown in the areas surrounding Fateh Pur include cotton, sugarcane, wheat and rice. Gardening and fruit production (dates, mangoes, watermelons, melons, and citrus fruit) is also important. Veterinary development is a common feature of the area. Various animals, including buffaloes, cows, goats, sheep, camels and poultry, are used for milk and meat production.

References 

Populated places in Layyah District
Punjab, Pakistan articles missing geocoordinate data